Jackson Park was a station on the Jackson Park Branch of the Chicago "L". The station opened on May 12, 1893, and closed on March 4, 1982, when "L" service on the Jackson Park branch was suspended due to structural defects in the Dorchester bridge over the Illinois Central Railroad. The station was later demolished. The station was the terminal of the Jackson Park branch from October 31, 1893 until March 4, 1982.

References

External links
 Jackson Park station page at Chicago-L.org
 Seen in a home movie from the 1970s or early 1980s

Defunct Chicago "L" stations
Railway stations in the United States opened in 1893
Railway stations closed in 1982
1893 establishments in Illinois
1982 disestablishments in Illinois
Chicago "L" terminal stations